RC Grivița București is a Romanian rugby union club currently playing in the Liga Națională de Rugby. They have won the Liga Națională de Rugby 12 times and the European Rugby Champions Cup in 1964.

Honours
European Rugby Champions CupWinners (1): 1964Runners-up (1): 1962Liga Națională de Rugby:Winners (12): 1948, 1950, 1955, 1957, 1958, 1959, 1960, 1962, 1966, 1967, 1969–70, 1992–93Cupa României Wineers (5):''' 1947, 1948, 1982, 1984, 1985

Current squad
In the 2022 edition of the Liga Națională de Rugby, the current squad is as follows:

References

External links
Liga Nationala de Rugby link

Romanian rugby union teams